Fucophlorethol A is a phlorotannin found in the brown alga Fucus vesiculosus.

References 

Phlorotannins